Click and Grow is an Estonian indoor gardening company, founded by Mattias Lepp in 2009. It develops consumer electronic products for growing edible plants indoors.

History 
Click and Grow was founded by Mattias Lepp, in Estonia, in 2009. In 2010, he won a local Ajujaht business idea competition with his idea for a 'Smart Flowerpot'. The idea took two years to develop before it was sold as a product.

As of 2018, Click and Grow employed 42 people, with offices in San Francisco, Tartu and Tallinn, and had more than 450,000 customers. In the same year the company received investment from INGKA Holding.

Between March and May 2020, during the COVID-19 pandemic, Click and Grow saw sales that were three to five times higher than normal. It was claimed that this was due to fresh food shortages and fear of them continuing, an effort to improve mental health, and in order to reduce food shopping frequency.

Products 
Click and Grow's products are self-irrigating and the system uses 'plant pods' that contain plant seeds, a growing medium and a controlled-release fertiliser.

Smart Flowerpot 
The Smart Flowerpot was introduced in 2011, as a battery powered, indoor plant pot that did not require manual watering or fertilizing. By 2012 Click & Grow had sold 90,000 Smart Flowerpots. However, customers in Nordic countries found that they had insufficient natural sunlight to grow many varieties of plant.

Click and Grow 
Click and Grow is a smart indoor gardening system that uses a self-watering design. It comes with pre-seeded pods and uses LED lights to grow plants. The Click and Grow app provides plant care guidance and allows you to monitor your plants’ progress from your phone.
 Pros:
It is very easy to use and requires minimal maintenance.
The system is compact and suitable for small spaces like apartments.
Click and grow offers a wide variety of plant pods to choose from, including herbs, vegetables and flowers.
The LED lights are energy-efficient and provide optimal light conditions for plant growth.
The automatic watering system ensures that the plants receive the right amount of water and nutrients.
Cons:
The initial cost of the system can be high compared to other indoor garden options.
Its pods are proprietary and can be more expensive than traditional seeds or seedlings.
The plant growth can be slower than expected, especially for larger plants.
The system is not as customizable as other indoor garden options, limiting the user’s ability to adjust lighting and watering conditions.
The plastic construction of the system may not be as durable as other materials.

Smart Herb Garden and Smart Garden 3 

In 2013, Click and Grow used Kickstarter to raise $625,000 for a Smart Herb Garden, which included an LED grow light, and could grow three plants at once. It began selling the Smart Herb Garden in January 2014. In 2017, a second generation of the garden was released called Smart Garden 3.

Smart Garden 9 and 27 
In 2016, Click and Grow launched a bigger version of the Smart Herb garden through another Kickstarter campaign - the Smart Garden 9, capable of growing nine plants at a time. The nine-plant unit is stacked using a three-tiered stand, to become a Smart Garden 27.

Smart Farm 
In 2015, Click and Grow introduced a larger indoor plant growing product which can grow up to 250 plants.

Wall Farm 
In 2016, Click and Grow launched the Wall Farm, which can grow up to 51 plants at a time.

References

External links 
 
 
 
 

2009 establishments in Estonia
Business organizations based in Estonia
Electronics companies established in 2009
Estonian brands
Hydroponics
Retail companies of Estonia
Technology companies of Estonia